Paul Trevor Collard (7 July 1952 – 28 December 2005) was an entrepreneur and founded U.S. Robotics in 1976 with Casey Cowell and Steve Muka.

Early life
Paul Collard was born in Weston-Super-Mare, England, to Roy and Margaret Collard. He went to the Weston-super-Mare Grammar School for Boys, and later graduated from University of Sussex with a degree in applied physics where he met his future wife.

U.S Robotics

While working at the University of Chicago's Computation Center, Paul joined up with Casey Cowell, Stephen Muka, Stan Metcalf, and Tom Rossen to form U.S. Robotics. Paul began designing modems using the digital Design skills he learned at the University of Sussex . Paul left U.S. Robotics in 1987.

Midway Labs
After attending a lecture at the University of Chicago on solar power, Paul left to start Midway Labs a solar power company using Roland Winston's non-imaging optics to build concentrator solar electric panels.

Personal life
Paul Collard married Rebecca Janowitz from Chicago. They have two children, named Daniel and Aaron.

External links
U.S. Robotics History - On USR's website
History of U.S. Robotics
Major milestones of University of Chicago Alumni
University of Chicago magazine Obituary

1952 births
2005 deaths
People from Weston-super-Mare
Alumni of the University of Sussex